Latain (also Romanized as Lata’īn; also known as Lataeen) is a village in Khaleh Sara Rural District, Asalem District, Talesh County, Gilan Province, Iran. At the 2006 census, its population was 297, in 64 families.

References 

Populated places in Talesh County